Artemisia afra, the African wormwood,[4] is a common species of the genus Artemisia in Africa, with a wide distribution from South Africa, to areas reaching to the North and East, as far north as Ethiopia. Artemisia afra is the only species in this genus indigenous to the African continent.

Growth
Artemisia afra grows in clumps, with ridged, woody stems, reaching from 0.5 meters to 2 meters in height. The leaves are dark green, of soft texture, and similar in shape to fern leaves. The undersides of the leaves are a lighter green, and are covered with white bristles. Artemisia afra blossoms in late summer, producing abundant bracts of butter-colored flowers, each approximately 3 to 5 millimeters in diameter. Artemisia afra exudes a pungent, sweet smell when any part of the plant is bruised.

Artemisia afra grows across a wide geographic area, including Kenya, Tanzania, Uganda, Ethiopia, Zimbabwe and Namibia. It grows primarily in areas that are damp, such as by the side of streams, and also in transitional areas between ecosystems.

Essential oil

Essential oil extracts of Artemisia afra are prepared by steam distillation using twigs and blossoms. Extracts contain the following components (via gas chromatography) which are typical of extracts of the genus Artemisia:

α-thujone 52.9%
β-thujone 15.07%
1,8 cineole 10.66%
camphor 5.72%
germacrene 1.60%
δ-cadinene 1.16%
α-terpineol 0.96%
e-chrysanthenyl acetate 0.78%
camphene 0.71%
β-pinene 0.51%
α-pinene 0.46%
trans-β-ocimene 0.45%
myrcene 0.22%

Other names
Aretemisia afra is known by a variety of names, primarily due to the number of native dialects in regions where it grows. Langana represents a Sotho-derived name for Artemisia afra. Other variants include:

 wild wormwood (English)
 African wormwood (English)
  (Afrikaans)
  (Xhosa)
  (Zulu)
  (Tswana)
  (Southern Sotho)
  (Luo)
  (Amharic)
 chii (Tchad)

References

Bremness, L. The complete book of herbs, Dorling Kindersley, London, 1988.
Jackson, W. Origins and meanings of names of South African plant genera, Univ. Cape Town, 1990.
The new Royal Horticultural Society dictionary of gardening, Huxley, A., et al., eds. Macmillan Press, London, 1992.
Liu, N. Q., Van der Kooy, F., Verpoorte, R. Artemisia afra: A potential flagship for African medicinal plants?, 2009.
Mangena, T., Muyima, N.Y.O. Comparative evaluation of the antimicrobial activities of essential oils of Artemisia afra, Pteronia incana and Rosmarinus officinalis on selected bacteria and yeast strains. 1999.
Mukinda, J., & Syce, J. Acute and chronic toxicity of the aqueous extract of Artemisia afra in rodents. 2007.
Thring, T.S.A., Weitz, F.M. Medicinal plant use in the Bredasdorp/Elim region of the Southern Overberg in the Western Cape Province of South Africa, 2006.
Watt, J.M., & Breyer-Brandwijk, M.G. Medicinal and poisonous plants of Southern and Eastern Africa, E. & S. Lvingstone Ltd.,  Edinburgh and London 1962
van Wyk, B-E., van Oudtshoorn, B. & Gericke, N. Medicinal plants of South Africa, Briza, Pretoria, 1997.

External links

 Artemisia afra Growth Distribution from Discover Life website

afra
Flora of Africa
Medicinal plants of Africa
Plants described in 1804